The Women's 400 metre freestyle competition of the 2019 African Games was held on 23 August 2019.

Records
Prior to the competition, the existing world and championship records were as follows.

Results

Final

The final was held on 23 August.

References

Women's 400 metre freestyle
2019 in women's swimming